Churchtown is a district to the north of Southport, Sefton, Merseyside, England.  It contains 84 buildings that are recorded in the National Heritage List for England as designated listed buildings.   Of these, one is listed at Grade II*, the middle of the three grades, and the others are at Grade II, the lowest grade.

Churchtown existed as a settlement before Southport developed as a town and seaside resort from the later part of the 18th century.  The houses were small and many of them had a single-depth plan (one room deep) and one storey.  Most of the listed buildings in the district are survivors from this time and of this type.  Other listed buildings are the country house Meols Hall and St Cuthbert's Church, together with structures associated with them.  In the later 19th century Southport Botanic Gardens were established in the district, and these contain a number of listed buildings.  Also included in the list are two public houses, an obelisk, and five lamp posts around the Green.

Key

Buildings

References

Citations

Sources

Listed buildings in Merseyside
Lists of listed buildings in Merseyside